Reprocessed uranium (RepU) is the uranium recovered from  nuclear reprocessing, as done commercially in France, the UK and Japan and by nuclear weapons states' military plutonium production programs. This uranium makes up the bulk of the material separated during reprocessing.

Commercial LWR spent nuclear fuel contains on average (excluding cladding) only four percent plutonium, minor actinides and fission products by weight. Despite it often containing more fissile material than natural uranium, reuse of reprocessed uranium has not been common because of low prices in the uranium market of recent decades, and because it contains undesirable isotopes of uranium.

Given sufficiently high uranium prices, it is feasible for reprocessed uranium to be re-enriched and reused. It requires a higher enrichment level than natural uranium to compensate for its higher levels of 236U which is lighter than 238U and therefore concentrates in the enriched product. If  interacts with a fast neutron there is a chance of a (n,2n) "knockout" reaction.
If fast breeder reactors ever come into widespread commercial use, reprocessed uranium, like depleted uranium, will be usable in their breeding blankets.

There have been some studies involving the use of reprocessed uranium in CANDU reactors.  CANDU is designed to use natural uranium as fuel; the 235U content remaining in spent PWR/BWR fuel is typically greater than that found in natural uranium, which is about 0.72% 235U, allowing the re-enrichment step to be skipped.  Fuel cycle tests also have included the DUPIC (Direct Use of spent PWR fuel In CANDU) fuel cycle, where used fuel from a Pressurized Water Reactor (PWR) is packaged into a CANDU fuel bundle with only physical reprocessing (cut into pieces) but no chemical reprocessing. Opening the cladding inevitably releases volatile fission products like xenon, tritium or krypton-85. Some variations of the DUPIC fuel cycle make deliberate use of this by including a voloxidation step whereby the fuel is heated to drive off semi-volatile fission products and/or subjected to one or more  reduction / oxidation cycles to transform nonvolatile oxides into volatile native elements and vice versa.

The direct use of recovered uranium to fuel a CANDU reactor was first demonstrated at Qinshan Nuclear Power Plant in China. The first use of re-enriched uranium in a commercial LWR was in 1994 at the Cruas Nuclear Power Plant in France.

There are provisions in place for the storage of this reprocessed uranium for up to 250 years for potential future use. Given France's domestic uranium enrichment capabilities, this stockpile constitutes a strategic reserve for the case of a major disruption of uranium supply as France does not have domestic uranium mining.

References

Further reading
Advanced Fuel Cycle Cost Basis - Idaho National Laboratory
 Module K2 Aqueously Reprocessed Uranium Conversion and Disposition
 Module K3 Pyrochemically/Pyrometallurgically Reprocessed Uranium Conversion and Disposition

Nuclear materials
Nuclear reprocessing
Uranium